Tastefully Simple, Inc. is a U.S. direct selling company that sells meal kits as well as signature seasonings, sauces and baking mixes, all prepared by adding two additional ingredients or less. Their TS EatWell products, which constitute 85% of the product line, are clean-label foods that contain no artificial colors, flavors or preservatives. The products are sold through a network of home-based commissioned distributors and online. As of 2019, the company employed roughly 75 people at its headquarters in Alexandria, Minnesota.

History
Tastefully Simple was founded on June 15, 1995, by Jill Blashack Strahan. First operated out of a small shed, the company later established its headquarters in Alexandria, MN. It was founded as a direct selling company and this model continues to be its largest selling channel. The company reported sales revenue of $110 million in 2011 and $82 million in 2013. Tastefully Simple celebrated its 25th anniversary in 2020.

Product Offerings
The company's products include meal kits, seasonings, sauces, baking mixes, and other prepared food items.

Distributors
Tastefully Simple's direct selling distributors, known as "consultants," may be eligible to earn sales commissions on their own sales as well as additional income based on the sales of distributors who they recruit, and additional bonuses and incentives, including travel. The company reported having 23,680 distributors as of 2011.

See also

 List of Minnesota companies

References

External links
 tastefullysimple.com, the company's official website
1995 establishments in the United States
Companies based in Minnesota
Retail companies established in 1995
Douglas County, Minnesota
Direct selling